Following is a list of notable think tanks in Singapore.

The Centre for Strategic Energy and Resources (CSER) was established in 2022 as an independent think-and-do tank in Singapore with a mission to build enabling ecosystems to accelerate energy transition in Asia.
The Centre for International Law was established in 2009 at the National University of Singapore.
Energy Studies Institute
The Institute of Policy Studies was established in 1988 and focuses on strategic policy research and discussion.
The Institute of Southeast Asian Studies is a regional research institute for the study of social-political, security and economic trends and developments in Southeast Asia.
Lee Kuan Yew School of Public Policy
S. Rajaratnam School of International Studies
Singapore Institute of International Affairs
Singapore International Foundation

See also

 List of think tanks

References

Think tanks in Singapore
Think tanks based in Singapore
Singapore